The dew point is the temperature to which air must be cooled to become saturated with water vapor, assuming constant air pressure and water content. When cooled below the dew point, moisture capacity is reduced and airborne water vapor will condense to form liquid water known as dew. When this occurs via contact with a colder surface, dew will form on that surface. 

The dew point is affected by humidity. When there is more moisture in the air, the dew point is higher.

When the temperature is below the freezing point of water, the dew point is called the frost point, as frost is formed via deposition rather than condensation.
In liquids, the analog to the dew point is the cloud point.

Humidity
If all the other factors influencing humidity remain constant, at ground level the relative humidity rises as the temperature falls; this is because less vapor is needed to saturate the air. In normal conditions, the dew point temperature will not be greater than the air temperature, since relative humidity typically does not exceed 100%.

In technical terms, the dew point is the temperature at which the water vapor in a sample of air at constant barometric pressure condenses into liquid water at the same rate at which it evaporates. At temperatures below the dew point, the rate of condensation will be greater than that of evaporation, forming more liquid water. The condensed water is called dew when it forms on a solid surface, or frost if it freezes.  In the air, the condensed water is called either fog or a cloud, depending on its altitude when it forms.  If the temperature is below the dew point, and no dew or fog forms, the vapor is called supersaturated. This can happen if there are not enough particles in the air to act as condensation nuclei.

The dew point depends on how much water vapor the air contains. If the air is very dry and has few water molecules, the dew point is low and surfaces must be much cooler than the air for condensation to occur. If the air is very humid and contains many water molecules, the dew point is high and condensation can occur on surfaces that are only a few degrees cooler than the air

A high relative humidity implies that the dew point is close to the current air temperature. A relative humidity of 100% indicates the dew point is equal to the current temperature and that the air is maximally saturated with water. When the moisture content remains constant and temperature increases, relative humidity decreases, but the dew point remains constant.

General aviation pilots use dew point data to calculate the likelihood of carburetor icing and fog, and to estimate the height of a cumuliform cloud base.

Increasing the barometric pressure increases the dew point. This means that, if the pressure increases, the mass of water vapor per volume unit of air must be reduced in order to maintain the same dew point. For example, consider New York City ( elevation) and Denver ( elevation). Because Denver is at a higher elevation than New York, it will tend to have a lower barometric pressure. This means that if the dew point and temperature in both cities are the same, the amount of water vapor in the air will be greater in Denver.

Relationship to human comfort
When the air temperature is high, the human body uses the evaporation of perspiration to cool down, with the cooling effect directly related to how fast the perspiration evaporates. The rate at which perspiration can evaporate depends on how much moisture is in the air and how much moisture the air can hold. If the air is already saturated with moisture (humid), perspiration will not evaporate. The body's thermoregulation will produce perspiration in an effort to keep the body at its normal temperature even when the rate at which it is producing sweat exceeds the evaporation rate, so one can become coated with sweat on humid days even without generating additional body heat (such as by exercising).

As the air surrounding one's body is warmed by body heat, it will rise and be replaced with other air. If air is moved away from one's body with a natural breeze or a fan, sweat will evaporate faster, making perspiration more effective at cooling the body. The more unevaporated perspiration, the greater the discomfort.

A wet bulb thermometer also uses evaporative cooling, so it provides a good measure for use in evaluating comfort level.

Discomfort also exists when the dew point is very low (below around ). The drier air can cause skin to crack and become irritated more easily. It will also dry out the airways.

A lower dew point can go along with a high temperature only at extremely low relative humidity, allowing for relatively effective cooling.

People inhabiting tropical and subtropical climates acclimatize somewhat to higher dew points. Thus, a resident of Singapore or Miami, for example, might have a higher threshold for discomfort than a resident of a temperate climate like London or Chicago. People accustomed to temperate climates often begin to feel uncomfortable when the dew point gets above , while others might find dew points up to  comfortable. Most inhabitants of temperate areas will consider dew points above  oppressive and tropical-like, while inhabitants of hot and humid areas may not find this uncomfortable. Thermal comfort depends not just on physical environmental factors, but also on psychological factors.

Dew point weather records
 Highest dew point temperature: A dew point of  — while the temperature was  — was observed at Dhahran, Saudi Arabia, at 3:00 p.m. on 8 July 2003.

Measurement
Devices called hygrometers are used to measure dew point over a wide range of temperatures. These devices consist of a polished metal mirror which is cooled as air is passed over it.  The temperature at which dew forms is, by definition, the dew point. Manual devices of this sort can be used to calibrate other types of humidity sensors, and automatic sensors may be used in a control loop with a humidifier or dehumidifier to control the dew point of the air in a building or in a smaller space for a manufacturing process.

Calculating the dew point

A well-known approximation used to calculate the dew point, Tdp, given just the actual ("dry bulb") air temperature, T (in degrees Celsius) and relative humidity (in percent), RH, is the Magnus formula:

The more complete formulation and origin of this approximation involves the interrelated saturated water vapor pressure (in units of millibars, also called hectopascals) at T, Ps(T), and the actual vapor pressure (also in units of millibars), Pa(T), which can be either found with RH or approximated with the barometric pressure (in millibars), BPmbar, and "wet-bulb" temperature, Tw is (unless declared otherwise, all temperatures are expressed in degrees Celsius):

For greater accuracy, Ps(T) (and therefore γ(T, RH)) can be enhanced, using part of the Bögel modification, also known as the Arden Buck equation, which adds a fourth constant d:

where
a = 6.1121 mbar, b = 18.678, c = 257.14 °C, d = 234.5 °C.

There are several different constant sets in use. The ones used in NOAA's presentation are taken from a 1980 paper by David Bolton in the Monthly Weather Review:
a = 6.112 mbar, b = 17.67, c = 243.5 °C.
Also noteworthy is the Sonntag1990,
Another common set of values originates from the 1974 Psychrometry and Psychrometric Charts, as presented by Paroscientific,
Also, in the Journal of Applied Meteorology and Climatology, Arden Buck presents several different valuation sets, with different maximum errors for different temperature ranges.  Two particular sets provide a range of −40 °C to +50 °C between the two, with even lower maximum error within the indicated range than all the sets above:

Simple approximation
There is also a very simple approximation that allows conversion between the dew point, temperature, and relative humidity. This approach is accurate to within about ±1 °C as long as the relative humidity is above 50%:

This can be expressed as a simple rule of thumb:
For every 1 °C difference in the dew point and dry bulb temperatures, the relative humidity decreases by 5%, starting with RH = 100% when the dew point equals the dry bulb temperature.

The derivation of this approach, a discussion of its accuracy, comparisons to other approximations, and more information on the history and applications of the dew point, can be found in an article published in the Bulletin of the American Meteorological Society. 

For temperatures in degrees Fahrenheit, these approximations work out to

For example, a relative humidity of 100% means dew point is the same as air temp. For 90% RH,  dew point is 3 °F lower than air temperature. For every 10 percent lower, dew point drops 3 °F.

Frost point 
The frost point is similar to the dew point in that it is the temperature to which a given parcel of humid air must be cooled, at constant atmospheric pressure, for water vapor to be deposited on a surface as ice crystals without undergoing the liquid phase (compare with sublimation). The frost point for a given parcel of air is always higher than the dew point, as breaking the stronger bonding between water molecules on the surface of ice compared to the surface of (supercooled) liquid water requires a higher temperature.

See also 
 Bubble point
 Carburetor heat
 Hydrocarbon dew point
 Psychrometrics
 Thermodynamic diagrams

References

External links
 Often Needed Answers about Temp, Humidity & Dew Point from the sci.geo.meteorology

Atmospheric thermodynamics
Temperature
Psychrometrics
Threshold temperatures
Gases
Meteorological data and networks
Humidity and hygrometry

sv:Luftfuktighet#Daggpunkt